The Texas lyre snake (Trimorphodon vilkinsonii) is a species of mildly venomous, rear-fanged snake in the family Colubridae. The species is endemic to the southwestern United States and adjacent northern Mexico.

Etymology
The epithet vilkinsonii is in honor of amateur American naturalist Edward Wilkinson, who collected the first specimen near the city of Chihuahua.

Geographic range
T. vilkinsonii is found in the United States in the Big Bend region of Texas and southern New Mexico, and in Mexico in northeastern Chihuahua.

Habitat
The preferred natural habitats of T. vilkinsonii are desert and rocky areas.

Description
The Texas lyre snake is a medium-sized snake, attaining a total length (including tail) of approximately 1 meter (39 inches) at adult size. It is brown, tan or gray with 17-24 dark brown blotches down the back. It has large eyes with vertical pupils. The common name, "lyre snake", refers to a distinctive V-shaped pattern on the head which resembles the shape of a lyre. However, this particular subspecies (T. b. vilkinsonii ) has no V mark on the head.

Behavior
Lyre snakes of the genus Trimorphodon are nocturnal, spending most of their time hiding in rock crevices, emerging to feed mainly on lizards, and also on small rodents, frogs, bats and birds. Their venom is not considered to be harmful to humans. Also, if their venom is not fatal to their prey, they may kill by constriction.

Conservation
The Texas lyre snake was formerly listed as Threatened in Texas, but was removed from the list in 2020. This species is secretive and often difficult to find, but is seemingly common throughout its habitat, much of which is in protected or private land.

Reproduction
Lyre snakes are oviparous, laying about a dozen eggs per clutch.

References

External links

NatureServe Explorer Comprehensive Species Report: Trimorphodon biscutatus

Further reading
Behler JL, King FW (1979). The Audubon Society Field Guide to North American Reptiles and Amphibians. New York: Alfred A. Knopf. 743 pp. . (Trimorphodon biscutatus vilkinsonii, p. 677 + Plate 568).
Cope ED (1886). "Thirteenth Contribution to the Herpetology of Tropical America". Proceedings of the American Philosophical Society 23: 271–287. (Trimorphodon vilkinsonii, new species, pp. 285–286).
Powell R, Conant R, Collins JT (2016). Peterson Field Guide to Reptiles and Amphibians of Eastern and Central North America, Fourth Edition. Boston and New York: Houghton Mifflin Harcourt. xiv + 494 pp., 47 plates, 207 figures. . (Trimorphodon vilkinsonii, pp. 400–401 + Plate 38).

Colubrids
Reptiles of the United States
Reptiles of Mexico
Taxa named by Edward Drinker Cope